Castrapo (a portmanteau of castelán and trapo, meaning rag), is the form of Spanish in the region of Galicia that uses much Galician vocabulary and syntax.

The dictionary published by the Royal Galician Academy defines it as a "variation of the Spanish language, distinguished by the abundance of words and expressions taken from Galician language". It is Spanish with many Galician features, not the other way around.

For example, the phrase Close the window would be Pecha a ventana. In standard Spanish, it would be Cierra la ventana, in Galician, it would be Fecha/Pecha a ventá/xanela/fiestra, and in Portuguese, it would be Fecha a janela.

Galician reintegrationist groups, which advocate for the unity of Galician and Portuguese as a single language, also use the word Castrapo to refer disapprovingly to the current standard form of Galician, which they consider to be too much influenced by Spanish and unnaturally distanced from standard Portuguese.

Phonology 

References

Bibliography

External links
 El español en contacto con el gallego, by Álvaro Porto Dapena. Ponencia en el II Congreso Internacional de la Lengua Española (Valladolid 2001) - in Spanish

Galician language
Spanish dialects of Spain